Ryan Donnelly (born December 13, 1978) is a former Canadian football guard for the Hamilton Tiger-Cats and Winnipeg Blue Bombers of the Canadian Football League. He was drafted by the Tiger-Cats in the fourth round of the 2001 CFL Draft. He played in preseason games for the Tiger-Cats in 2001 and then returned to McMaster for his final season of CIS football. He then returned to the Tiger-Cats in 2002.

References

External links
Just Sports stats
Winnipeg Blue Bombers bio

1978 births
Living people
Canadian football offensive linemen
Hamilton Tiger-Cats players
McMaster Marauders football players
Players of Canadian football from Ontario
Sportspeople from St. Catharines
Winnipeg Blue Bombers players